D'Agata is a family name of Italian origin.

Notable people with the surname include:

 Antoine D'Agata, French photographer and film director
 Antonino D'Agata, Italian  politician
 Charlie D'Agata, American reporter
 Giuseppe D'Agata, Italian writer
 John D'Agata,  American essayist 
 Mario D'Agata, Italian boxer

See also 
 Agata (surname)

 
Italian-language surnames